Glutamate dehydrogenase (NADP+) (glutamic dehydrogenase, dehydrogenase, glutamate (nicotinamide adenine dinucleotide (phosphate)), glutamic acid dehydrogenase, L-glutamate dehydrogenase, L-glutamic acid dehydrogenase, NAD(P)+-glutamate dehydrogenase, NAD(P)H-dependent glutamate dehydrogenase, glutamate dehydrogenase (NADP+)) is an enzyme with systematic name L-glutamate:NADP+ oxidoreductase (deaminating). This enzyme catalyses the following chemical reaction

 L-glutamate + H2O + NADP+  2-oxoglutarate + NH3 + NADPH + H+

References

External links 
 

EC 1.4.1